Miss America 2013, the 86th Miss America pageant, was held at the PH Live at Planet Hollywood Resort & Casino on the Las Vegas Strip in Paradise, Nevada on Saturday, January 12, 2013.

Results

Placements

* - America's Choice

** - Saved by judges to compete in final competition.

Order of announcements

Top 16

Top 12

Top 10

Top 5

Awards

Preliminary awards

Quality of Life award

Duke of Edinburgh awards

Other awards

Judges
The seven judges for the competition were:
 Bradley Bayou, fashion designer
 Cheryl Burke, professional dancer
 Sam Champion, television weather anchor
 Mary Hart, television personality and Miss South Dakota 1970
 Daymond John, entrepreneur
 McKayla Maroney, Olympic gymnast
 Katie Stam Irk, Miss America 2009

Contestants

Replacements
 Miss Oregon - Nichole Mead was originally the first runner-up but later was crowned Miss Oregon 2012 to replace the original winner, Rachel Berry, who resigned due to concerns over length of residency.

References

External links
 Miss America official website

2013
2013 in the United States
2013 beauty pageants
2013 in Nevada
Zappos Theater
January 2013 events in the United States